Arsenio Martínez-Campos y Antón, born Martínez y Campos (14 December 1831, in Segovia, Spain – 23 September 1900, in Zarauz, Spain), was a Spanish officer who rose against the First Spanish Republic in a military revolution in 1874 and restored Spain's Bourbon dynasty. Later, he became Captain-General of Cuba. Martínez Campos took part in wars in Africa, Mexico and Cuba and in the Third Carlist War.

Education and early military career
In 1860, he was sent to Africa to take part in the Tetuán War in Morocco, and he distinguished himself in 16 actions, obtaining the Cross of San Fernando and the rank of lieutenant colonel. He also took part in the Mexican 1861 campaign against urban rebels under General Juan Prim in a joint expedition along with France and Britain.

Ten Years' War
After the Revolution of 1868, Martínez Campos requested a posting to Cuba, where he fought against the rebels in 1869 in the Ten Years' War, gaining the rank of brigadier general. Success in this war was often a matter of perception. The Spanish Army, after taking massive losses, would take the field in bayonet charges.

Despite technically winning, the Spanish losses against the Cuban rebels would make the Cubans consider the action to be a victory for the body count and then withdraw. The Cubans also knew that movements of Spanish in the field raised the exposure of the Spanish forces to yellow fever and other tropical diseases, which would hurt the enemy even further.
https://www.gutenberg.org/ebooks/4210
Perceived as too soft to win, he was displaced by the ruthless Blas Villate, Count of Balmaceda, who proceeded with a brutal campaign of ethnic cleansing, "The Rising Flood of Valmaseda."

Political and military intrigue in Spain
In 1872, Martínez Campos returned to Spain, where he backed the coup d'état led by Manuel Pavía. There, he took charge of several brigades to fight the Carlist uprisings with little success. Then, he was put in charge of the Valencian army, fighting independent forces in Alicante and Cartagena.

The chaotic situation in Spain caused him to plot against the Republic and for Alfonso XII, son of the exiled Isabel II.

Though Martínez Campos made no secret of his designs, Marshal Serrano in 1874 appointed him to the command of a division, which took part in the relief of Bilbao on 2 May and in the operations around Estella-Lizarra in June. On both occasions, Martínez Campos tried in vain to induce the other commanders to proclaim Alfonso XII. He was quartered in Ávila under surveillance but managed to escape and hid in Madrid.

On 29 December 1874, Martínez Campos led a coup d'état in Sagunto to restore the throne to Alfonso XII. Later, he was named Captain General of Catalonia after defeating the Carlists there, ending the civil war, and in Navarre in the Restoration.

Governor of Cuba
He was made captain general (governor) of Cuba in 1876. His reputation as a noble warrior allowed him to arrange a peace treaty (Paz de Zanjón) with the war-weary Cuban rebels in 1878. The treaty granted more autonomy to Cuba and freedom to rebels who had been slaves, and, a few years afterward, it led to the complete abolition of slavery on the island.

Returning to Spain, after presiding over a conservative government in 1879 as Cánovas's puppet, he was forced to leave the Conservative Party since he favoured granting total freedom to all races in Spain.

He turned to the Liberals. As Minister for War under Sagasta, he founded the General Military Academy. After the death of King Alfonso in 1885, Martínez Campos steadily supported the regency of Queen Maria Christina and held high commands but declined to take office.

Spanish-American War

Two years later at age 53, he was sent to Cuba as the first general to face down a Cuban attempt at independence. The campaign faced difficulties from the very beginning, with much of the imperial force suffering from malaria and yellow fever during the first summer in the swamps. Moreover, the insurgents' use of dynamite and ambush proved effective in pushing back against the superior numbers of the Spanish force. After months of rebels executing effective raids and capturing undefended towns, Campos attempted to provoke a decisive fight in July. However, superior tactics by the rebels led his side to flee the field, a major humiliation for the Spanish. With increasing pressure from both the rebels and his own government, Campos began considering more extreme measures. Facing an incorrectly perceived need to toughen measures against the rebels, he refused to order ethnic cleansing and resigned his post and was replaced by Valeriano Weyler.

Days after the defeat, Campos sent a letter to the Spanish prime minister outlining a strategy by which hundreds of thousands of rural Cubans could be "reconcentrated" behind trenches and barbed wire in Spanish-held towns, isolating the insurgents in the countryside and cutting the support to the rebels given throughout the war by the rural population. However, Campos refused to implement this tactic himself, refusing to raise the stakes of an already brutal campaign. Campos offered to hand over his imperial post.

Return to Spain and death
Martínez Campos returned to Spain, where he was named president of the Supreme War and Navy Council but resigned after a month within office. He died on September 23, 1900 at Zarauz.

References

Sources
 Anon. (1906) Monumento al general Martínez Campos, Madrid : Establecimiento Tipografico "El Trabajo", 580 p.
 Navarro Martin, Antonio (1878) Opúsculo sobre la Pacificacion de Cuba, acompañado ... de los festejos de la paz y biografía ... de su ilustre pacificador ... D. Arsenio Martinez de Campos, México, 78 p.
 Tone, John Lawrence (2006) War and genocide in Cuba, 1895–1898, Chapel Hill : University of North Carolina Press,

External links

1831 births
1900 deaths
People from Segovia
Prime Ministers of Spain
Conservative Party (Spain) politicians
Liberal Party (Spain, 1880) politicians
Governors of Cuba
People of the Ten Years' War
Knights of the Golden Fleece
Captains General of Catalonia
Presidents of the Senate of Spain
Spanish military personnel of the Third Carlist War (Governmental faction)
Spanish military personnel of the Spanish–American War